John Patrick Walsh (21 August 1892 – 18 September 1915) was an Australian rules footballer who played with South Melbourne in the Victorian Football League (VFL).

Death
He had been suffering from ill-health for some time, and he died at his uncle's residence at Tarilta, Victoria, on 18 September 1915, aged 23.

Notes

External links 

1892 births
1915 deaths
Australian rules footballers from Melbourne
Sydney Swans players
People from Albert Park, Victoria